Ferenc Lőrincz (born 17 September 1932) is a Hungarian speed skater. He competed in three events at the 1952 Winter Olympics.

References

External links
 
 
 
 

1932 births
Living people
Hungarian male speed skaters
Olympic speed skaters of Hungary
Speed skaters at the 1952 Winter Olympics
Speed skaters from Budapest